Arranged marriage is a type of marital union where the bride and groom are primarily selected by individuals other than the couple themselves, particularly by family members such as the parents. In some cultures a professional matchmaker may be used to find a spouse for a young person.

Arranged marriages have historically been prominent in many cultures. The practice remains common in many regions, notably South Asia, the Middle East, North Africa, Sub-Saharan Africa, and the Caucasus. In many other parts of the world, the practice has declined substantially during the 19th and 20th centuries.

Forced marriages, practiced in some families, are condemned by the United Nations. The specific sub-category of forced child marriage is especially condemned. In other cultures, people mostly choose their own partner.

History
Arranged marriages were very common throughout the world until the 18th  century. Typically, marriages were arranged by parents, grandparents or other close relatives and trusted friends. Some historical exceptions are known, such as courtship and betrothal rites during the Renaissance period of Italy and Gandharva Vivah in the Vedic period of India.

Marriage in Greco-Roman antiquity was based on social responsibility. Marriages were usually arranged by the parents; on occasion professional matchmakers were used. For the marriage to be legal, the woman's father or guardian had to give permission to a suitable man who could afford to marry. Orphaned daughters were usually married to cousins. The couple participated in a ceremony which included rituals such as removal of the veil. A man was typically limited to only one wife, though he could have as many mistresses as he could afford.

In China, arranged marriages (baoban hunyin, 包办婚姻) – sometimes called blind marriages (manghun, 盲婚) – were the norm before the mid-20th century. A marriage was a negotiation and decision between parents and other older members of two families. The boy and girl were typically told to get married, without a right to demur, even if they had never met each other until the wedding day.

Arranged marriages were the norm in Russia before the early 20th century, most of which were endogamous.

Until the first half of the 20th century, arranged marriages were common in migrant families in the United States. They were sometimes called "picture-bride marriages" among Japanese-American immigrants because the bride and groom knew each other only through the exchange of photographs before the day of their marriage. These marriages among immigrants were typically arranged by parents or close relatives from the country of their origin. As immigrants settled in and melded into a new culture, arranged marriages shifted first to quasi-arranged marriages where parents or friends made introductions and the couple met before the marriage; over time, the marriages among the descendants of these immigrants shifted to autonomous marriages driven by individual's choice, dating and courtship preferences, and an increase in marrying outside of their own ethnic group. Similar historical dynamics are claimed in other parts of the world.

Arranged marriages have declined in prosperous countries with social mobility and increasing individualism; nevertheless, arranged marriages are still seen in countries of Europe and North America, among royal families, aristocrats and minority religious groups such as in placement marriage among Fundamentalist Mormon groups of the United States. In most other parts of the world, arranged marriages continue to varying degrees and increasingly in quasi-arranged form, along with autonomous marriages.

Enforcement

A woman who refuses to go through with an arranged marriage, tries to leave an arranged marriage via divorce or is suspected of any kind of "immoral" behaviour, may be considered to have dishonored her entire family. This being the case, her male relatives may be ridiculed or harassed and any of her siblings may find it impossible to enter into a marriage. In these cases, killing the woman is a way for the family to enforce the institution of arranged marriages. Unlike cases of domestic violence, honor killings are often done publicly for all to see and there are frequently family members involved in the act.

Comparison
Marriages have been categorized into four groups in scholarly studies:

 Forced arranged marriage: parents or guardians select, the individuals are neither consulted nor have any say before the marriage

 Consensual arranged marriage: parents or guardians select, then the individuals are consulted, who consider and consent, and each individual has the power to refuse; sometimes, the individuals meet – in a family setting or privately – before engagement and marriage as in shidduch custom among Orthodox Jews
 Self-selected marriage: individuals select, then parents or guardians are consulted, who consider and consent, and where parents or guardians have the power of veto.
 Autonomous marriage: individuals select, the parents or guardians are neither consulted nor have any say before the marriage

Gary Lee and Lorene Stone suggest that most adult marriages in recent modern history are somewhere on the scale between consensual arranged and autonomous marriage, in part because marriage is a social institution. Similarly, Broude and Greene, after studying 142 cultures worldwide, have reported that 130 cultures have elements of arranged marriage.

Extreme examples of forced arranged marriage have been observed in some societies, particularly in child marriages of girls below age 12. Illustrations include vani which is currently seen in some tribal/rural parts of Pakistan, and Shim-pua marriage Taiwan before the 1970s (Tongyangxi in China).

Types
There are many kinds of arranged marriages, some of these are:

Arranged exogamous marriage: is one where a third party finds and selects the bride and groom irrespective of their social, economic and cultural group.
Arranged endogamous marriage: is one where a third party finds and selects the bride and groom from a particular social, economic and cultural group.
Consanguineous marriage: is a type of arranged endogamous marriage. It is one where the bride and groom share a grandparent or near ancestor. Examples of these include first cousin marriages, uncle-niece marriages, second cousin marriages, and so on. The most common consanguineous marriages are first cousin marriages, followed by second cousin and uncle-niece marriages. Between 25 and 40% of all marriages in parts of Saudi Arabia and Pakistan are first cousin marriages; while overall consanguineous arranged marriages exceed 65 to 80% in various regions of North Africa and Central Asia.

The bride and groom in all of the above types of arranged marriages, usually do have the right to consent; if the bride or the groom or both do not have a right to consent, it is called a forced marriage. Forced marriages are not the same as arranged marriages; these forced arrangements do not have the full and free consent of both parties, and no major world religion advocates for forced marriages. Arranged marriages are commonly associated with religion; a few people in some religions practice this form of marriage the religion does not promote it.

According to The Hindu Marriage Act, 1955 of India, non-consensual marriages and marriages where either the bridegroom is below the age of 21 years or the bride is below the age of 18 are prohibited for the Hindus, Buddhist, Sikhs and Jains.

Non-consanguineous arranged marriage is one where the bride and groom do not share a grandparent or near ancestor. This type of arranged marriages is common in Hindu and Buddhist South Asia, Southeast Asia, East Asia and Christian Latin America and sub-Saharan Africa. Consanguineous marriages are against the law in many parts of United States and Europe. In the United Kingdom uncle-niece marriages are considered incestuous and are illegal, but cousin marriages are not forbidden, although there have been calls to ban first-cousin marriages due to health concerns. While consanguineous arranged marriages are common and culturally preferred in some Islamic countries and among migrants from Muslim countries to other parts of the world, they are culturally forbidden or considered undesirable in most Christian, Hindu and Buddhist societies. Consanguineous arranged marriages were common in Jewish communities before the 20th century, but have declined to less than 10% in modern times.

Causes and prevalence
Over human history through modern times, the practice of arranged marriages has been encouraged by a combination of factors, such as the practice of child marriage, late marriage, tradition, culture, religion, poverty and limited choice, disabilities, wealth and inheritance issues, politics, social and ethnic conflicts.

Child marriage

Child marriage, particularly 12 years old for men, 9 years old for girls because of they are entering teenages. Sperm production in men and menstrual period in women begin at these ages. Does not prepare or provide the individual much opportunity to make an informed, free choice about matrimony. These child marriages are implicitly arranged marriages. In rural areas of East Asia, Sub-Saharan Africa, South Asia and Latin America, poverty and lack of options, such as being able to attend school, leave little choice to children other than be in early arranged marriages. Child marriages are primarily seen in areas of poverty. Parents arrange child marriages to ensure their child's financial security and reinforce social ties. They believe it offers protection and reduces the daughter's economic burden on the family due to how costly it is to feed, clothe and (optionally) educate a girl. By marrying their daughter to a good family, the parents improve their social status by establishing a social bond between each other.

According to Warner, in nations with the high rates of child marriages, the marriage of the girl is almost always arranged by her parents or guardians. The nations with the highest rates of arranged child marriages are: Niger, Chad, Mali, Bangladesh, Guinea, Central African Republic, Afghanistan, Yemen, India and Pakistan. Arranged child marriages are also observed in parts of the Americas.

Poverty
In impoverished communities, every adult mouth to feed becomes a continuing burden. In many of these cultures, women have difficulty finding gainful employment (or are simply prohibited from doing so), and their daughters become the greatest burden to the family. Some scholars argue that arranging a marriage of a daughter becomes a necessary means to reduce this burden. Poverty, thus, is a driver of arranged marriage.

This theory is supported by the observed rapid drop in arranged marriages in fast growing economies of Asia. The financial benefit parents receive from their working single daughters has been cited as a reason for their growing reluctance to see their daughters marry at too early an age.

Late marriage
Late marriage, particularly past the age of 30 years old, reduces the pool of available women for autonomous marriages. Introductions and arranged marriages become a productive option.

For example, in part due to economic prosperity, about 40% of modern Japanese women reach the age of 29 and have never been married. To assist late marriages, the traditional custom of arranged marriages called miai-kekkon is re-emerging. It involves the prospective bride and groom, family, friends and a matchmaker (nakōdo, 仲人); the pair is selected by a process with the individuals and family involved (iegara, 家柄). Typically the couple meets three times, in public or private, before deciding if they want to get engaged.

Limited choices
Migrant minority ethnic populations have limited choice of partners, particularly when they are stereotyped, segregated or avoided by the majority population. This encourages homogamy and arranged marriages within the ethnic group. Examples of this dynamic include Sikh marriages between 1910 and 1980 in Canada, arranged marriages among Hasidic Jews, and arranged marriages among Japanese American immigrants before the 1960s, who would travel back to Japan to marry the spouse arranged by the family, and then return married. In other cases, a girl from Japan would arrive in the United States as a picture bride, pre-arranged to marry the Japanese American man on arrival, whom she had never met.

Custom
Arranged marriage may be the consequence of certain customs. For example, in rural and tribal parts of Pakistan and Afghanistan, disputes, unpaid debts in default and crimes such as murder are settled by a council of village elders, called jirga. A typical punishment for a crime committed by males involves requiring the guilty family to marry their virgin girls between 5 and 12 year old to the other family. This custom requires no consent from the girl, or even her parents. Such arranged child marriages are called vani, swara and sak in different regional languages of Pakistan.

Another custom in certain Islamic nations, such as Pakistan, is watta satta, where a brother-sister pair of one family are swapped as spouses for a brother-sister pair of another family. In other words, the wife is also the sister-in-law for the males in two families. This custom inherently leads to arranged form of marriage. About 30% of all marriages in western rural regions of Pakistan are by custom watta-satta marriages, and 75% of these Muslim marriages are between cousins and other blood relatives. Some immigrant families prefer customary practice of arranged marriage.

Politics

Arranged marriages across feudal lords, city states and kingdoms, as a means of establishing political alliances, trade and peace were common in human history. When a king married his son to a neighboring state's daughter, it indicated an alliance among equals, and signaled the former's state superiority. For example, the fourth daughter of Maria Theresa, Archduchess of Austria and Queen of Hungary, Marie Antoinette, married the dauphin (crown prince) of France, who would become King Louis XVI.

Wealth and inheritance issues
Throughout most of human history, marriage has been a social institution that produced children and organized inheritance of property from one generation to next. Various cultures, particularly some wealthy royals and aristocratic families, arranged marriages in part to conserve or streamline the inheritance of their wealth.

Tongyangxi, also known as Shim-pua marriage in Taiwanese – literally child or little daughter-in-law – was a tradition of arranged marriage, in which a poor family would arrange and marry a pre-adolescent daughter into a richer family as a servant. The little girl provided slave-like free labor, and also the daughter-in-law to the adoptive family's son. This sort of arranged marriage, in theory, enabled the girl to escape poverty and the wealthy family to get free labor and a daughter-in-law. Zhaozhui was a related custom by which a wealthy family that lacked an heir would arrange marriage of a boy child from another family. The boy would move in with the wealthy family, take on the surname of the new family, and marry the family's daughter. Such arranged marriages helped maintain inheritance bloodlines. Similar matrilocal arranged marriages to preserve wealth inheritance were common in Korea, Japan and other parts of the world.

Bride-wealth

In many cultures, particularly in parts of Africa and the Middle East, daughters are valuable on the marriage market because the groom and his family have to (not must) pay cash or property for the right to marry the daughter. This is termed as bride-wealth and locally by various names such as Lobola and Wine Carrying. The bride-wealth is typically kept by the bride's family, after the marriage, and is a source of income to poor families. The brothers, father, and male relatives of the bride typically take keen interest in arranging her marriage to a man who is willing to pay the most wealth in exchange for the right to marry her.

Religion
Some religious denominations recognize marriages only within the faith. Of the major religions of the world, Islam forbids marriage of girls of a devout parent to a man who does not belong to that religion. In other words, Islam forbids marriage of Muslim girls to non-Muslim men, and the religious punishment for those who marry outside might be severe. This is one of the motivations of arranged marriages in Islamic minority populations in Europe.

Arranged marriage is practiced by members of the Apostolic Christian Church, an Anabaptist denomination of Christianity:

Since religion is important in the Hindu community, parents often find spouses that have the same religion for their children. When two people with different religions fall in love, one must convert to the other's religion, forsaking their own. It is socially unacceptable for people to intermarry, which is why parents arranging a marriage for their children will make sure they marry someone from the same faith. Hindus favor religious segregation, so many of them do not keep friendships with those from other religions. A study shows that 45% of Hindus only have friends who have the same religion as them and 13 percent have friends with different religions. This trains children to only desire to be around those of the same religion since intermingling of religious friendships and marriages are not too common. Furthermore, the people must marry within their caste system and most have a specific type of religion. They are taught this from a young age and it is considered one of the most important rules. When love outside of a person's caste happens, the parents sometimes threaten to kill the lover. Families fear of the opinions of the public is another reason why parents forbid their children from marrying outside their caste. The lowest, known as the untouchables, are seen as unclean and they are not even allowed to walk past someone from a higher caste because of fear that they will defile them.

Controversy
Arranged marriages are actively debated between scholars. The questions debated include whether arranged marriages are being used to abuse international immigration system, to inherently violate human rights, particularly women's rights, if they yield more stable marriages for raising children, the next generation, and whether there is more or less loving, respectful relationship for the married couple.

Sham marriages
In the United Kingdom, public discussion has questioned whether international arranged marriages are a sham without the intention that the spouses will live as a couple, a convenient means to get residency and European citizenship to some male or female immigrants, who would otherwise be denied a visa to enter the country. These fears have been stoked by observed divorces once the minimum married residence period requirement is met. MP Ann Cryer has alleged examples of such abuse by West Asian Muslim families in her motion to the UK's House of Commons. The United States has seen a similar controversy with sham arranged marriages.

Human rights
Various international organizations, including UNICEF, have campaigned for laws to ban arranged marriages of children, as well as forced marriages. Article 15 and 16 of The Convention on the Elimination of All Forms of Discrimination Against Women (CEDAW) specifically cover marriage and family law, which support such as ban.

Arranged marriages are a matter of debate and disagreements. Activists, such as Charlotte Bunch, suggest that marriages arranged by parents and other family members typically assume heterosexual preference and involve emotional pressure; this drives some individuals into marriages that they consent under duress. Bunch suggests that all marriages should be autonomous.

In contrast, preventing arranged marriages may harm many individuals who want to get married and can benefit from parental participation in finding and selecting a mate. For example, Willoughby suggests that arranged marriages work because they remove anxiety in process of finding the spouses. Parents, families and friends provide an independent perspective when they participate in learning and evaluating the other person, past history, behavior, as well as the couple's mutual compatibility. Willoughby further suggests that parents and family provide more than input in the screening and selection process; often, they provide financial support for the wedding, housing, emotional support and other valuable resources for the couple as they navigate past the wedding into married life, and help raise their children.

Michael Rosenfeld says that the differences between autonomous marriages and arranged marriages are empirically small; many people meet, date and choose to marry or cohabit with those who are similar in background, age, interests and social class they feel most similar to, screening factors most parents would have used for them anyway. Assuming the pool from which mates are screened and selected is large, Rosenfeld suggests that the differences between the two approaches to marriages are not as great as some imagine them to be. Others have expressed sentiments similar to Rosenfeld.

Stability
Divorce rates have climbed in the European Union and the United States with increase in autonomous marriage rates. The lowest divorce rates in the world are in cultures with high rates of arranged marriages such as Amish culture of United States (1%), Hindus of India (3%), and Ultra-Orthodox Jews of Israel (7%). According to a 2012 study by Statistic Brain, 53.25% of marriages are arranged worldwide. The global divorce rate for arranged marriages was 6.3%, which could be an indicator for the success rate of arranged marriages. This has led scholars to ask if arranged marriages are more stable than autonomous marriages, and whether this stability matters. Others suggest that the low divorce rate may not reflect stability, rather it may reflect the difficulty in the divorce process and social ostracism to the individuals, who choose to live in a dysfunctional marriage rather than face the consequences of a divorce. Also, the perception of high divorce rates attributed to self-arranged marriages in the United States is being called into question.

Love and respect in arranged versus autonomous marital life
Various small sample surveys have been done to ascertain if arranged marriages or autonomous marriages have a more satisfying married life. The results are mixed – some state marriage satisfaction is higher in autonomous marriages, others find no significant differences. Johnson and Bachan have questioned the small sample size and conclusions derived from them.

Scholars ask whether love and respect in marital life is greater in arranged marriages than autonomous marriages. Epstein suggests that in many arranged marriages, love emerges over time.  Neither autonomous nor arranged marriages offer any guarantees. Many arranged marriages also end up being cold and dysfunctional as well, with reports of abuse. 

In some cultures where arranged marriages are common; there is a higher inequality between men and women. Some believe that those in arranged marriages might have a more satisfying union since they have realistic expectations and are not clouded by emotion when going into the marriage, while others believe it can lead to unhappiness and discontentment in the marriage. Many people that are in autonomous marriages look at arranged marriages as a way of force, but results have shown that many people go into arranged marriages out of their own free will. According to one study, the divorce rate was 4% for arranged marriages, while in the U.S., 40% of autonomous marriages end in divorce. There's also been questions about sexual gratification; In Japan it was reported that the men in arranged marriages are more sexually satisfied, while in autonomous marriages the partners are in the middle. In India, there showed to be an equal amount of compassionate love shown between arranged marriages and autonomous marriages.

See also

 Arranged marriage in the Indian subcontinent
 Arranged marriages in Japan
 Blessing ceremony of the Unification Church
 Bride price
 Bride kidnapping
 Child marriage
 Courtship
 Dowry
 Lavender marriage
 Mail-order bride
 Marriage
 Marriage of convenience
 Marriage of state
 Marriage in Pakistan
 Marriage in South Korea
 Marriage market
 Marriageable age
 Married at First Sight
 Matrimonial websites
 Picture Bride (film)
 Redorer son blason
 Royal intermarriage
 Shidduch
 Shim-pua marriage
 Shotgun wedding
 Log Kya Kahenge

References

 
Matchmaking
Traditions

de:Heiratsvermittlung#Abgrenzung zur Zwangsheirat